Sindolus is a Neotropical genus of water scavenger beetles in the family Hydrophilidae represented by eight described species, ranging from Mexico to Argentina, and including one species recorded from Antigua in the Lesser Antilles.

Taxonomy 
The genus Sindolus belongs in the subfamily Acidocerinae. It was first described by David Sharp in 1882 to accommodate two Central American species. Since 1919 Sindolus was considered a subgenus of the genus Helochares by d’Orchymont  and stayed in that category until a molecular-based phylogenetic analysis  supported its restitution at the category of genus.

Description 
Small to sized beetles (2.5–5.0 mm), smooth and shiny dorsally, moderately to strongly convex in lateral view; yellowish, orange-brown, to brown in coloration, with long maxillary palps. The most distinctive characteristic of Sindolus is the presence of a sharp and strongly elevated (laminar) longitudinal carina on the mesoventrite. A complete diagnosis was presented by Girón and Short.

Habitat 
Some species of Sindolus have been collected in stagnant waters at low elevations in dry areas.

Species 

 Sindolus femoratus (Brullé, 1841): Argentina, Brazil (Bahia, Pernambuco, Piauí, Rio de Janeiro, Rio Grande do Sul), Colombia [in doubt], French Guiana [in doubt], Antigua.
 Sindolus mesostitialis (Fernández, 1981): Argentina, Brazil (Mato Grosso do Sul) 
 Sindolus mini (Fernández, 1982): Argentina, Paraguay
 Sindolus mundus Sharp, 1882: Costa Rica, Mexico, Nicaragua
 Sindolus optatus Sharp, 1882: Costa Rica, Guatemala, Mexico
 Sindolus spatulatus (Fernández, 1981): Argentina, Paraguay
 Sindolus talarum (Fernández, 1983): Argentina
 Sindolus ventricosus (Bruch, 1915): Argentina, Bolivia, Brazil (Amazonas, Mato Grosso do Sul, Pernambuco), Paraguay, Uruguay.

References 

Hydrophilidae
Insects of South America
Insects described in 1882